Azodicarbonamide, ADCA, ADA, or azo(bis)formamide, is a chemical compound with the molecular formula C2H4O2N4. It is a yellow to orange-red, odorless, crystalline powder. It is sometimes called a 'yoga mat' chemical because of its widespread use in foamed plastics. It was first described by John Bryden in 1959.

Synthesis
It is prepared in two steps via treatment of urea with hydrazine to form biurea, as described in this idealized equation:
2 OC(NH2)2 + N2H4 → H2NC(O)-N(H)-N(H)-C(O)NH2 + 2 NH3

Oxidation with chlorine or chromic acid yields azodicarbonamide:
H2NC(O)-N(H)-N(H)-C(O)NH2 +  Cl2  → H2NC(O)-N=N-C(O)NH2 + 2 HCl

Applications

Blowing agent
The principal use of azodicarbonamide is in the production of foamed plastics as a blowing agent. The thermal decomposition of azodicarbonamide produces nitrogen, carbon monoxide, carbon dioxide, and ammonia gases, which are trapped in the polymer as bubbles to form a foamed article.

Azodicarbonamide is used in plastics, synthetic leather, and other industries and can be pure or modified. Modification affects the reaction temperatures. Pure azodicarbonamide generally reacts around 200 °C. In the plastic, leather, and other industries, modified azodicarbonamide (average decomposition temperature 170 °C) contains additives that accelerate the reaction or react at lower temperatures.

An example of the use of azodicarbonamide as a blowing agent is found in the manufacture of vinyl (PVC) and EVA-PE foams, where it forms bubbles upon breaking down into gas at high temperature. Vinyl foam is springy and does not slip on smooth surfaces. It is useful for carpet underlay and floor mats. Commercial yoga mats made of vinyl foam have been available since the 1980s; the first mats were cut from carpet underlay.

Food additive
As a food additive, azodicarbonamide is used as a flour bleaching agent and a dough conditioner.  It reacts with moist flour as an oxidizing agent. The main reaction product is biurea, which is stable during baking. Secondary reaction products include semicarbazide and ethyl carbamate. It is known by the E number E927. Many restaurants in the US fast food industry removed the additive in response to negative publicity.

Safety and regulation

Occupational (inhalation) 
In a 1999 report, the World Health Organization has linked exposure to azodicarbonamide at workplaces where it is manufactured or handled in raw form to "respiratory issues, allergies and asthma". The available data are restricted to these occupational environments. Exposure of the general public to azodicarbonamide could not be evaluated because of the lack of available data. The WHO concluded, "The level of risk is uncertain; hence, exposure levels should be reduced as much as possible".

In the UK, the Health and Safety Executive has identified azodicarbonamide as a respiratory sensitizer (a possible cause of asthma) in workplace settings and determined that containers of it should be labeled with "May cause sensitisation by inhalation." Azodicarbonamide was added to the REACH Regulation candidate Substances of Very High Concern list in 2012, for its respiratory sensitizing properties.

Food (ingestion) 
In some jurisdictions, the use of azodicarbonamide as a flour bleaching agent has been phased out. For example, it is no longer authorized for use in Australia and the European Union as a food additive. Azodicarbonamide as a blowing agent in plastics has been banned in the European Union since August 2005 for the manufacture of plastic articles that are intended to come into direct contact with food.
In the United States, azodicarbonamide has a generally recognized as safe (GRAS) status and is allowed to be added to flour at levels up to 45 ppm. However, use in products intended for human consumption is in decline under pressure of the public opinion. In 2014, amid public discomfort with the dual uses of azodicarbonamide, the sandwich franchise Subway and hamburger franchise Wendy's announced that they would no longer use it as a dough conditioner. As of February 2014, the Center for Science in the Public Interest stated azodicarbonamide "has been poorly tested" and advocates for reducing the amount of azodicarbonamide that is allowed to be used in food.

The ban on ADA in food is mostly motivated by the weak carcinogenic property of semicarbazide, a side product of ADA use. The EU banned ADA in food containers despite an EFSA report considering such exposure "not a concern" due to low levels produced. The FDA's review maintains that ADA is safe at amounts allowed.

As of February, 2021, in contrast to direct competitors like Wendy's that have phased out the ingredient, A&W continues to use azodicarbonamide in an unspecified quantity ("under 2 %") in their standard hamburger buns.

References

External links
International Chemical Safety Card

Food additives
Azo compounds
Bleaches